Doğukan is a common masculine Turkish given name. It is composed of two words: doğu ("east") and kan ("khan"). Thus, "Doğukan" can mean "sovereign/ruler of the east".

People
 Doğukan Olgun, Turkish computer engineer living in Europe
 Doğukan Coşar, Turkish judoka with Down syndrome
 Doğukan Çiloğlu, Turkish rower in Galatasaray Rowing
 Doğukan Pala, Turkish footballer
 Doğukan Sönmez, Turkish basketball player

 Doğukan Yaprak, Turkish intellectual 

 Doğukan Sinik, Turkish footballer for Hull City

Turkish masculine given names